The Extreme Light Infrastructure (ELI) is an international series of physics laboratories for generating and studying intense laser light. It is part of the European ESFRI Roadmap. ELI hosts the most intense beamline system worldwide, develop new interdisciplinary research opportunities with light from these lasers and secondary radiation derived from them, and make them available to the international scientific user community. ELI aims to be the world's biggest and first international user facility in beamline and laser research.

The facility will be based on four sites. Three of them are presently being implemented in the Czech Republic, Hungary and Romania, with an investment volume exceeding €850 million, mostly stemming from the European Regional Development Fund (ERDF). In Dolní Břežany, near Prague, Czech Republic, the ELI Beamlines facility is developing short-pulse secondary sources of radiation and particles. The ELI Attosecond Light Pulse Source (ELI-ALPS) in Szeged, Hungary is establishing a unique facility which provides light sources within an extremely broad frequency range in the form of ultrashort pulses with high repetition rate. In  Măgurele, Romania, the ELI Nuclear Physics (ELI-NP) facility is focusing on laser-based nuclear physics. The location of ELI's fourth pillar, the highest-intensity pillar, is still to be decided. Its laser power is expected to exceed that of the current ELI pillars by about one order of magnitude.

History
The Extreme Light Infrastructure project started as a bottom-up initiative by the European scientific laser community and the network of large national laser facilities, LASERLAB-EUROPE, in the context of the preparation of the first European ESFRI Roadmap in 2005. From 2007 to 2010 ELI entered into a European-Commission-funded preparatory phase, comprising 40 laboratories from 13 countries. Gérard Mourou, the initiator of the ELI project, was the coordinator of the preparatory phase.

At the meeting of the Steering Committee on October 1, 2009 in Prague, the ELI Preparatory Phase Consortium officially gave the mandate to the Czech Republic, Hungary and Romania to proceed towards the construction of ELI. On December 10, 2010, at the end of the preparatory phase, the project was fully handed over to the ELI Delivery Consortium, consisting of representatives from the three host countries. ERDF funding of the ELI-Beamlines facility in the Czech Republic was granted by the European Commission on April 20, 2011, followed by ELI-Nuclear Physics in Romania on September 18, 2012. Funding for the ELI-ALPS facility in Hungary was granted in early 2014.

The ELI Delivery Consortium International Association was founded on April 11, 2013 as an international non-profit association under Belgian law (AISBL). It promotes the sustainable development of ELI as a pan-European research infrastructure, supports the coordinated implementation of the ELI research facilities, and preserves the consistency and complementarity of their scientific missions. It also organises the establishment of an international consortium that will be in charge of the future operation of ELI, preferably in the form of a European Research Infrastructure Consortium (ERIC). The ELI-DC International Association is open to membership by institutions from all interested countries.

ELI research centres

ELI Beamlines
ELI Beamlines is located in Dolní Břežany near Prague, Czech Republic.  The main goal at ELI Beamlines is to create the most advanced laser equipment in the world. This will be accomplished and implemented through research projects covering the interaction of light with matter at intensities that are 10 times higher than the values that are currently achievable. With ultra-short laser pulses that last only some femtoseconds and performances of up to 10 PW, ELI will bring new techniques and tools for basic research as well as for areas such as medical imaging and diagnostics, radiotherapy, new materials, and X-ray optics.

ELI Beamlines Laser Center is a unique top-class device built for Czech and international scientific research – for users who carry out basic and applied research experiments using four ultra-intensive laser systems (L1–L4), which are gradually put into full operation.

ELI Beamlines is designed as a high-energy and high-repetitive pillar of the European ELI (Extreme Light Infrastructure) project. The main objective of the project is, in accordance with the ELI White Paper [1], to create a high-energy beam device that can develop and utilize ultra-short pulses of high energy particles and radiation stemming from relativistic and ultrarelativistic interactions. The ELI Beamlines Center strives to address one of the "major challenges", namely generating ultrashort pulses of energy particle beams (> 10 GeV) and radiation (up to several MeV) generated by compact laser plasma accelerators. They are expected to support the ultra-high science science, ie to achieve an ultra-relativistic regime.

Building opened in 2015
User experiments started in 2018

ELI Beamlines laser systems

L1 ALLEGRA – TW laser, 100 millijoule, 1 kHz – in operation

L2 AMOS – 100 TW laser, 2 joule, 50 Hz

L3 HAPLS – 1 PW laser, 30 joule, 10 Hz – in operation

L4 ATON – 10 PW laser, 2 kilojoule – in operation

ELI-ALPS
ELI-ALPS is located in Szeged, in southern Hungary. The main objective of ELI-ALPS, the attosecond pillar of the Extreme Light Infrastructure, in accordance with the ELI White Paper is 1) to generate X-UV and X-ray femtosecond and attosecond pulses, for temporal investigation at the attosecond scale of electron dynamics in atoms, molecules, plasmas and solids; 2) source developments (towards high average power, high peak intensity pulses).

The ELI-ALPS lasers have matchless parameters that enable the generation of unique attosecond pulses and pulsetrain in the VUV and X-ray spectral regions that are not available elsewhere.

ELI-ALPS Laser Technology

ELI-ALPS offers more than just the use of a novel class of state-of-the-art laser systems. The unique combination of the outstanding laser pulses with the pioneering secondary sources technologies will open up new opportunities in experimental research. This places ELI-ALPS as one of the leading lights in ultrafast physical processes as well as a world-class centre for generating outstanding biological, chemical, medical and materials science results.
 
Key characteristics include:	
 The peak power and repetition rate of few cycle phase stabilized laser systems are ranging from fraction of TW to multi-PW, and 100 kHz to 10 Hz, respectively.
 High-energy extreme ultraviolet photons (10 eV – 10 keV) will be generated via high-harmonic processes in gases and on solids, leading to single pulses with a pulse duration as short as tens of attoseconds.
 X-rays (100 keV) will originate from a dedicated relativistic laser-electron Thomson scattering source (available after intensive development phase following 2021).
 THz pulses with even mJ energy are generated via optical rectification in nonlinear crystals.

Building opened in 2017

User experiments started in 2018

ELI NP

The ELI NP Research Centre is a facility under construction in Măgurele, Romania, that hosts the world's most powerful laser. Among other uses, the laser technology might be used to destroy nuclear waste and provide a new type of cancer radiotherapy called hadrontherapy. The largest scientific project in Romania, ELI-NP will be a European and international centre for high-level research on ultra-high intensity laser, laser-matter interaction and secondary sources with unparalleled possibilities. 

ELI-NP is a very complex facility, which will host two machines of extreme performances: 
 a very high intensity laser, where two 10 PW laser beams are coherently added to get intensities of the order of 1023–1024 W/cm2 and electrical fields of 1015 V/m over an area of a few square micrometers.
 a very intense (1013 γ/s), brilliant γ beam, 0.1% bandwidth, with Ev > 19 MeV, which is obtained by incoherent Compton back scattering of a laser light off a very brilliant, intense, classical electron beam (Ee > 700 MeV) produced by a warm linac.

Work on the infrastructure started on 14 June 2013. The research building has been built on seismic shock absorbers and has two solid bodies – one for lasers and one for the gamma beam, totaling an area of 11,010 m2. The building also includes clean rooms, experimental areas and laboratories, with an area of 2,396 m2. The laser facility will have eight underground levels, while the gamma beam facility will have 12 underground levels. The research complex also includes an office building with an area of approximately 970 m2 and a guest house with approximately 30 rooms, occupying 642 m2.

The laser system was made in France by Thales Group. The announcement of the ELI-NP high-power laser system test results was made on March 13, 2019 in Măgurele, confirming the achievement of a power of 10 PW, a milestone for world-class research. With two laser beams of 10 PW power each, the ELI-NP laser system is the most powerful ever made.

See also
Station of Extreme Light

References

External links

ELI Beamlines website
https://www.eli-alps.hu/

Research lasers
Particle physics facilities
Laser awards and associations